Tripping may refer to:

 Psychedelic experience
 Tripping (ice hockey), a penalty infraction
 Tripping (pipe), the act of running or pulling drill pipe into or out of a wellbore on a drilling rig
 "Tripping" (song), a 2005 single by Robbie Williams
 tripping.com, a metasearch engine for vacation homes

See also
 Trippin' (disambiguation)
 Trip (disambiguation)